Love That Brute is a 1950 American comedy crime film directed by Alexander Hall and starring Paul Douglas and Jean Peters. The film is a remake of Tall, Dark and Handsome, a 1941 film also distributed by 20th Century Fox.

Plot

In 1928 Chicago, two gangsters kill a store owner. Mobster Big Ed (Paul Douglas) sends top henchman Bugsy Welch (Keenan Wynn) to place a white carnation—his trademark—on the corpses, to suggest that he is responsible. The police rush to arrest Big Ed, only to find out that he has an alibi. He has been in the park, where Big Ed encounters Ruth Manning (Jean Peters), a country girl who came to Chicago to be a singer, but is now a children's governess.

Big Ed falls in love with the woman—in his opinion, she has class—and is determined to court her. He poses as a widowed father and asks her to take care of his child, with the promise of tripling her salary. When she accepts, he sends Bugsy to audition a son for him. Bugsy comes up with Harry the Kid Jr. (Peter Price), the foul-mouthed son of a gangster. Ruth grows close to Big Ed, but is offended when he gives her an expensive fur coat on Christmas Eve, thinking that he wants to "buy" her affection. She packs her bags to leave, but Big Ed convinces her to stay until they find Harry a school.

The next day, the mansion is surrounded by the men of Pretty Willie Wetzchahofsky (Cesar Romero), Big Ed's arch-rival. Ruth wants to warn the police, but is discouraged to do so by a friend of Big Ed's who is posing as a maid, Mamie Sage (Joan Davis), who then reveals to her who Big Ed really is. Ruth is appalled, but decides to stay until Harry is enrolled at a military academy. Meanwhile, Big Ed has come to a truce with Pretty Willie, and they agree to not interfere with each other's mob activities.

Months later, Ruth is a singer in Big Ed's former night club. Big Ed attends her opening night and wants to reconcile, but Pretty Willie, who is also interested in Ruth, convinces her that Big Ed is a ruthless killer. She finds out that Harry has been missing from military school. After finding him, she learns through Bugsy that Big Ed has never hurt anyone in his life, and that all his alleged victims, including Mamie's husband, are living in his basement.

These prisoners escape and show up at a party. Pretty Willie is disappointed that Big Ed is not the tough guy he thought he was. He orders his men to kill Big Ed. They, however, appreciate Big Ed's kindness and help him escape while faking his death. Bugsy identifies a body as Big Ed, and during "his" funeral, Ed shows up and surprises Ruth. She admits that she was crushed to think that he was dead, and they kiss. Big Ed has Pretty Willie arrested. He then joins Ruth, Harry and Bugsy on a ship, where they will be married.

Cast
 Paul Douglas as E.L. 'Big Ed' Hanley
 Jean Peters as Ruth Manning
 Cesar Romero as Pretty Willie Wetzchahofsky
 Keenan Wynn as Bugsy Welch
 Joan Davis as Mamie Sage
 Arthur Treacher as Quentin, Big Ed's butler
 Peter Price as Harry the Kid Jr.
 Jay C. Flippen as Biff Sage
 Barry Kelley as Detective Charlie
 Leon Belasco as François Ducray a.k.a. Frenchy

Production
Co-star Cesar Romero also starred in the original film, Tall, Dark and Handsome. In the original film, he portrayed the kind gangster, whereas in this remake, he was seen as the villain. Studio chief Darryl F. Zanuck initially suggested actor Richard Basehart for this villain role, before Romero took over. The lead role went to Paul Douglas in April 1949. Leading lady Jean Peters was cast in June 1949. For her night club scene, she had to wear a dress that rendered her unable to sit down. To prepare for the singing and dancing scene, Peters took a few lessons with Betty Grable's dance instructor.

Shooting took place in the summer of 1949, under the working title Turned Up Toes.

This was Arthur Treacher's next-to-last film appearance in his lifetime; 14 years later, he was seen as Constable Jones in Mary Poppins.

Reception
The entertainment magazine Variety named Paul Douglas' character auditioning a son one of the film's "high spots" and in addition wrote that his "fine performance is matched by Peters, who registers impressively as a prim governess and a sultry nitery singer, scoring with Rodgers and Hart oldie, 'You Took Advantage of Me'."

A radio adaptation was broadcast on the Lux Radio Theatre on October 9, 1950, with Douglas and Peters reprising their roles.

References

External links
 
 
 

1950 films
1950s crime comedy films
20th Century Fox films
American crime comedy films
American black-and-white films
Films directed by Alexander Hall
Films scored by Cyril J. Mockridge
Remakes of American films
Films set in Chicago
American gangster films
Films set in 1928
1950 comedy films
1950s English-language films
1950s American films